A cluster farm is a traditional western Norwegian farm settlement with multiple individual farms and with the houses of the various farms located close together, more or less irregularly in relation to each other, so that it is difficult to see any regular pattern.

Typical examples of cluster farms include Havrå on the island of Osterøy, Agatunet in the Hardanger district, Henjum in Hermansverk, Tyssedalen in the municipality of Fjaler, Osmundnes in the municipality of Gloppen, Sjønstå in the municipality of Fauske, and remaining parts of Larsbakken.

Cluster farms originated through repeated division of farms. The division was to be made fairly, and so every single field plot was therefore divided. The plots of land therefore became increasingly smaller, and each user received an increasingly complex property to deal with.

References

Further reading
Visted, Kristofer, & Hilmar Stigum. 1971. Vår gamle bondekultur. Oslo: Cappelen, .
Vreim, Halvor. 1938. Trekk fra byggeskikkens geografi i Norge. Årsberetning 1936–37. Oslo: Foreningen til norske fortidsminnesmerkers bevaring.
Lars Roede. 2014. Bygningsarven 1814. In: Jørn Holme (ed.), De kom fra alle kanter – Eidsvollsmennene og deres hus, pp. 25–51. Oslo: Cappelen Damm 2014, p. 43. .

Landscape architecture
History of agriculture